III is a Canadian short drama film, directed by Salomé Villeneuve and released in 2022. Partially inspired by her own childhood relationship with her brothers, the film centres on 
Saul (Eliott Desjardins Gauthier), Éli (Alex Dupras) and Lila (Anne Florence Lavigne-Desjardins), three young siblings who are spending a hot summer day at the lake.

The film premiered at the 2022 Venice Film Festival.

The film was a Canadian Screen Award nominee for Best Live Action Short Drama at the 11th Canadian Screen Awards.

References

External links

2022 films
2022 short films
2022 drama films
Canadian drama short films
2020s French-language films
2020s Canadian films
French-language Canadian films
Films shot in Quebec